In molecular biology, glycoside hydrolase family 108 is a family of glycoside hydrolases.

Glycoside hydrolases  are a widespread group of enzymes that hydrolyse the glycosidic bond between two or more carbohydrates, or between a carbohydrate and a non-carbohydrate moiety. A classification system for glycoside hydrolases, based on sequence similarity, has led to the definition of >100 different families. This classification is available on the CAZy web site, and also discussed at CAZypedia, an online encyclopedia of carbohydrate active enzymes.

Glycoside hydrolase family 108 CAZY GH_108 includes enzymes with lysozyme (N-acetylmuramidase)  activity. A glutamic acid residue within a conserved Glu-Gly-Gly-Tyr motif is essential for catalytic activity. In bacteria, it may activate the secretion of large proteins via the breaking and rearrangement of the peptidoglycan layer during secretion.

References

EC 3.2.1
GH family
Protein families